Leh district is a district in the union territory of Ladakh, India. With an area of 45,110 km2, it is the second largest district in the country, second only to Kutch. It is bounded on the north by Gilgit-Baltistan's Kharmang and Ghanche districts and Xinjiang's Kashgar Prefecture and Hotan Prefecture, to which it connects via the historic Karakoram Pass. Aksai Chin and Tibet are to the east, Kargil district to the west, and Lahul and Spiti to the south. The district headquarters is in Leh. It lies between 32 to 36 degree north latitude and 75 to 80 degree east longitude.

All of Ladakh was under the administration of Leh until 1 July 1979, when the Kargil and Leh administrative districts were created. Religion has been a source of grievance between Buddhists and Muslims since the late 20th century and contributed to this division.

In 2017, the district was declared a tobacco-free zone. The Directorate of Health Services Kashmir, under the National Tobacco Control Programme, began working towards the designation early in 2017 and the status was declared in August. Rehana Kousar (in-charge, NTCP, Kashmir) said that work was done with civil society, religious and women's groups and that a "major success was achieved by the involvement of women in the anti-tobacco campaign."

In August 2019, the Parliament of India passed the act that contained provisions to make Leh a district of the new union territory of Ladakh, which was formed 31 October 2019.

Administration
Leh district has seven sub-divisions and twelve tehsils.
The sub-divisions are: Nubra, Durbuk (Durbok), Khalatse (Khaltsi/Khalsi), Leh, Kharoo, Likir, Nyoma.
The tehsils are: Sumoor,and Diskit in Nubra Valley, Durbuk, Khalatse, Saspol, Leh, Kharoo, and Nyoma.

As a result of The Jammu and Kashmir Reorganisation (Removal of Difficulties) Second Order, 2019, Leh district claimed de jure jurisdiction over the following areas of Pakistani-administered Kashmir: Gilgit, Gilgit Wazarat, Chilas, and Tribal territory, making it only slightly smaller than the country of Tunisia.

The Ladakh Autonomous Hill Development Council, Leh (LAHDC Leh) is the Autonomous District Council that administers the Leh district.

As of July 2019, Leh district is divided into 7 sub-divisions (new sub-divisions in Leh), 12 tehsils (new tehsils in Panamik, Turtuk, Chuchot and Likir) and 18 new blocks in Sumoor and Likir (blocks).

Demographics

According to the 2011 census Leh district had a population of 133,487, roughly equal to the nation of Saint Lucia. This gives it a ranking of 609th in India (out of a total of 640). Its population growth rate over the decade 2001-2011 was 13.87%, (it was 30.15% for 1991–2001). Leh has a sex ratio of 690 females for every 1000 males (this varies with religion), and a literacy rate of 77.2%.

Religion

Languages 
Ladakhi is the most spoken language, and Hindi/Urdu is the second-largest language, mainly spoken in Leh. Balti is found in Nubra near the boundary with Gilgit-Baltistan. Tibetan, Punjabi, Marathi and Nepali are all mainly spoken in Leh. Urdu and English are widely understood in Leh.

Politics

Parliamentary Constituency
The district falls under Ladakh (Lok Sabha constituency). The present Member of Parliament (MP) of Ladakh is Jamyang Tsering Namgyal of the BJP

Assembly constituencies
Leh district had two assembly constituencies, Nubra and Leh under Jammu and Kashmir Legislative Assembly. Since Ladakh is a union territory without a legislature, it does not currently have a legislative assembly.

Autonomous Hill Council
Leh District is administered by an elected body known as the Ladakh Autonomous Hill Development Council, Leh. The LAHDC was established in 1995.

The latest elections were held in October 2020. The BJP secured 15 seats while the INC won 9 and the Independents won 2.

Transportation

Road
Leh is connected to the rest of India by two high-altitude roads both of which are subject to landslides and neither of which are passable in winter when covered by deep snows. The National Highway 1D from Srinagar via Kargil is generally open longer. The Leh-Manali Highway can be troublesome due to very high passes and plateaus, and the lower but landslide-prone Rohtang Pass near Manali. The third road axis is under construction.

National Highway 1
The overland approach to Ladakh from the Kashmir valley via the 434-km. National Highway 1 typically remains open for traffic from June to October/November. The most dramatic part of this road journey is the ascent up the 3,505 m (11,500 ft.) high Zoji-la, a tortuous pass in the Great Himalayan Wall. The Jammu and Kashmir State Road Transport Corporation (JKSRTC) operates regular Deluxe and Ordinary bus services between Srinagar and Leh on this route with an overnight halt at Kargil. Taxis (cars and jeeps) are also available at Srinagar for the journey.

National Highway 3 or Leh-Manali Highway
Since 1989, the 473-km Leh-Manali Highway has been serving as the second land approach to Ladakh. Open for traffic from June to late October, this high road traverses the upland desert plateaux of Rupsho whose altitude ranges from 3,660 m to 4,570 m. There are a number of high passes en route among which the highest one, known as Tanglang La, is sometimes (but incorrectly) claimed to be the world's second-highest motorable pass at an altitude of 5,325 m. (17,469 feet).

 Nimmu–Padam–Darcha road

This is the third road axis to Leh. It is currently under construction.

Air

Leh's Leh Kushok Bakula Rimpochee Airport has flights to Delhi at least daily on Air India which also provides twice-weekly services to Jammu and a weekly flight to Srinagar. Passengers connect in Delhi for other destinations. Go First operates Delhi to Leh daily flights during peak time.

Rail
There is no railway service currently in Ladakh, however, 2 railway routes are proposed- the Bhanupli–Leh line and Srinagar–Kargil–Leh line.

Gallery

See also
 List of districts of Ladakh
 Geography of Ladakh
 Tourism in Ladakh

References

External links

 Official Website of Ladakh Autonomous Hill Development Council, Leh
 Leh tehsil map, Maps of India
 Ladakh Tourism Guide - Photo Gallery of Leh, Monasteries in Leh, NGO's in Leh, Important Phone #.
 Shaam Region in Leh (not to be confused with the Middle Eastern region)

 
1979 establishments in Jammu and Kashmir
Leh
Geography of Ladakh
Minority Concentrated Districts in India
Autonomous regions of India
Districts of Ladakh